Roland James Griffin (May 14, 1885 – death date unknown) was an American Negro league pitcher in the 1910s.

A native of Columbia, Kentucky, Griffin played for the Indianapolis ABCs in 1913. In eight recorded appearances on the mound, he posted a 3.72 ERA over 55.2 innings.

References

External links
Baseball statistics and player information from Baseball-Reference Black Baseball Stats and Seamheads

1885 births
Year of death missing
Place of death missing
Indianapolis ABCs players